Stronghold is the fourth full-length album by the Austrian black metal band Summoning. This album marked a change in the sound of Summoning as it was much more "guitar orientated with more compact keyboard-melodies". "Where Hope and Daylight Die" features Tania Borsky, Protector's ex-girlfriend and a former member of Die Verbannten Kinder Evas, on lead vocals. The album's cover was adapted from 'The Bard', an 1817 painting by John Martin.

This album is the first by Summoning to feature audio-clips; the clips used on this album were from the movies Braveheart and Legend.

Track listing

Credits
Protector - vocals, guitars, keyboards
Silenius - vocals, keyboards
Tania Borsky - vocals on 'Where Hope and Daylight Die'

Lyrical references
Stronghold marks the first time in which not all lyrics were derived from J. R. R. Tolkien

 Rhûn is Elvish word for "east" and was the name used for all lands lying east of Middle-Earth
 Long Lost To Where No Pathway Goes is taken from the Lays of Beleriand, The Lay of the Children of Húrin and a Tolkien poem about St. Brendan's death, called Imram.
 The Glory Disappears is taken from William Wordsworth's poems "Loud Is the Vale" & "Lines Left Upon a Seat in a Yew-Tree"
 Like Some Snow-White Marble Eyes is about when Húrin is held captive by Morgoth and the lyrics are derived from a poem by Robert Frost called "Stars"
 Where Hope and Daylight Dies is from the Tolkien poem, "I Sit Upon the Stones Alone"
 The Rotting Horse on the Deadly Ground is taken from "The Song of Eriol" from the Book of Lost Tales.
 The Shadow Lies Frozen on the Hills is lyrically based on two poems found in The Fellowship of the Ring, in the chapters "A Conspiracy Unmasked" and "Many Meetings"
 The Loud Music of the Sky was taken from Sir Walter Scott's "The Monastery", Chapter 12th, and from Dora Sigerson Shorter's poem "The Wind on the Hills", and from the anonymous 17th-century poem "The Fairies' Song".
 A Distant Flame Before The Sun the lyrics are taken from the "I Sit Beside the Fire and Think" and "Song of Eärendil" which was written & performed by Bilbo in Rivendell ("The Ring Goes South" in "The Fellowship of the Ring")

References

1999 albums
Summoning (band) albums
Napalm Records albums